Marguerite Cazeneuve (born 1988) is a French specialist in social affairs, health and pensions. She is an adviser of President Emmanuel Macron.

Biography 
She was a student at HEC Paris from 2008 to 2013, where she was elected president of the student office. She did internships at Procter & Gamble (end of 2010) and at McKinsey (2011). She specializes during her course (master's degree in “media, arts and creation”).

In December 2014, spotted during this mission, she was recruited at the Ministry of Social Affairs and Health, and appointed secretary general of the ONDAM steering committee.

In July 2021, when Jean Castex became Prime Minister, his chief of staff Nicolas Revel promoted her to head of the health-solidarity-social protection division of his cabinet. In this capacity, it oversees the management of the Covid-19 crisis for the Government.

In March 2021, she was appointed Deputy Director at the National Fund for Health Insurance.

She coordinates Emmanuel Macron's program on health, autonomy, social protection and pensions during the presidential campaign of 2022.

Personal life 
She is the daughter of Jean-René Cazeneuve, MP for Gers and Béatrice Cazeneuve, executive at Eli Lilly France.

She has been in a relationship with Aurelien Rousseau, member of the Council of State and director of the Prime Minister's cabinet since May 17, 2022.

References 

1988 births
Living people
French political consultants
La République En Marche!
HEC Paris alumni
21st-century French women